"Find My Love" is a song by British band Fairground Attraction, which was released as their second single from their debut album The First of a Million Kisses in July 1988. As with much of their debut album, the words and music of the song are written by Mark Nevin.

The single peaked at number 7 on the UK Singles Chart and spent a total of 11 weeks on the chart. It was their last single to reach a top 40 position. The song also reached the top 10 in Austria and Ireland, where it peaked at number 3 and 6, respectively.

Musically, "Find My Love" is characterised by its use of the Spanish guitar.

Track listings
7" single
"Find My Love"
"Watching the Party"

12" single
"Find My Love"
"Watching the Party"
"You Send Me"
"Ay Fond Kiss"

Charts

Weekly charts

Year-end charts

References

External links

1988 singles
1988 songs
Fairground Attraction songs
RCA Records singles
Songs written by Mark Nevin